William Pinckney Mason (10 January 1843 – 16 December 1922) was a lieutenant in the Confederate States Navy, ultimately serving as commander of several ironclad gunboats. Mason was a great-grandson of George Mason, author of the Virginia Bill of Rights, and his wife Ann Eilbeck.

Early life and education
Mason was born on 10 January 1843, in Alexandria and was the youngest child of a large family born to Dr. Richard Chichester Mason and his wife Lucy Bolling Randolph.

American Civil War
Mason resigned from the United States Navy as an acting midshipman on 19 April 1861.  Mason enlisted in the Confederate States Navy where he became an acting midshipman on 11 June 1861 and served on the CSS United States. On 7 January 1864, Mason was promoted to master in line of promotion and was made 2nd Lieutenant on 2 June 1864.  Mason later served as commander of the CSS Beaufort and CSS Virginia II.

Marriage and children
Mason married Elizabeth Ruthven McGill on 29 January 1873 and they had three children:

Wardlaw McGill Mason (1876–1936)
Lucius Randolph Mason (28 January 1886–23 November 1984)
Shirley Carter Mason Prescott (12 October 1891–21 March 1972)

Later life
After a brief illness, Mason died on 16 December 1922 at his residence in Rockville, Maryland at the age of 80. He was buried after 16 December 1923 at Rockville Cemetery in Rockville.

Ancestry

References

1843 births
1922 deaths
American Episcopalians
American people of English descent
American planters
Confederate States Navy officers
Maryland Democrats
Mason family
Military personnel from Alexandria, Virginia
People from Rockville, Maryland
People of Virginia in the American Civil War
United States Navy officers
Virginia Democratic-Republicans
Virginia Democrats
Burials in Maryland